Harry Clark Schwarts (born Harry Schwerdtjeyer, August 10, 1918 - February 22, 1963) was a professional baseball umpire who worked in the American League from 1960 to 1962. Schwarts umpired 338 major league games in his three-year career. He also umpired in the 1962 Major League Baseball All-Star Game That 1962 season, Schwarts was home plate umpire for two no-hitters: Bo Belinsky's on May 5  and Earl Wilson's on June 26. He is one of a handful of umpires to call balls and strikes for two no-hitters in one season.

Schwarts died on February 22, 1963, before the  season began. His death allowed the American League to call up 28-year old Bill Haller, who would go on to work four World Series in 20 seasons.

References

External links
 The Sporting News umpire card

1918 births
1963 deaths
Major League Baseball umpires
Sportspeople from Ohio
People from Cambridge, Ohio